is a phở restaurant chain based in Sacramento, California, United States. It was founded in San Jose, California, in 1983. , it has more than 70 locations across the United States, Canada, Indonesia, Malaysia, the Philippines, South Korea, and Taiwan.

History
In 1984, Binh Nguyen and Phan Jiang opened their first  location in Lion Plaza, the first Asian shopping center in San Jose, California, based on a  restaurant that opened in Santa Ana the previous year. In 1986, they began manufacturing a proprietary spice blend for their phở. In the late 1980s, they opened their first restaurant in Canada.

 claims to be the first Vietnamese restaurant chain to franchise. According to company statistics, Asians accounted for almost 90% of their customers until around 1993, but by 1998 about 50% of customers at recently opened locations were non-Asian.

See also

 List of restaurant chains in the United States
 List of noodle restaurants
 List of casual dining restaurant chains
 List of Vietnamese restaurants
 Lee's Sandwiches, another Vietnamese restaurant chain that began in San Jose in 1983

References

External links
 

Pho
Companies based in Sacramento, California
Restaurants in San Jose, California
Regional restaurant chains in the United States
Regional restaurant chains in Canada
Restaurant chains in Indonesia
Restaurant chains in the Philippines
Restaurant chains in South Korea
Restaurant chains in Taiwan
Restaurants established in 1983
Vietnamese restaurants in the United States
Vietnamese-American culture in California
1983 establishments in California